Frédéric Chopin's Impromptu No. 3 in G major, Op. 51, for piano, was composed in 1842 and published in February 1843. It was the last in order of composition of his four impromptus, but the third published.

The piece is written in  time.

References

External links 
 
 Impromptu No. 3 sheet music available at Musopen.com
 Impromptu No. 3 played by Alfred Cortot
 Impromptu No. 3 played by Artur Rubinstein 

Compositions by Frédéric Chopin
Compositions for solo piano
1842 compositions
Compositions in G-flat major

fr:Impromptu nº 3 de Chopin